Corylophus is a genus of beetles belonging to the family Corylophidae.

The species of this genus are found in Europe, Southern Africa and Japan.

Species:
 Corylophus cassidordes (Marsham)

References

Corylophidae
Coccinelloidea genera